Mogi das Cruzes ( or ) is a municipality in the state of São Paulo, Brazil, located within the metropolitan region of the state capital of the city of São Paulo. The population is 450,785 (2020 est.) in an area of 713 km2. It is located 40 km to the east of the city of São Paulo. It was founded in 1560 by the bandeirantes.

Districts 

The municipality is subdivided into the following districts:
 Brás Cubas (named after Brás Cubas)
 Biritiba-Ussu
 César de Sousa
 Jundiapeba
 Quatinga
 Sabaúna
 Taiaçupeba

Demography

Notable people 
 Bruno Bronetta - retired footballer
 Bruno Cazarine - retired professional footballer, played at top levels in Brazil, Europe, Middle East, Asia and currently in Belarus with Dinamo Minsk.
 Edmar Halovskyi - retired professional footballer, who played for Ukraine national team.
 Maikon Leite - professional footballer, plays for Figueirense.
 Neymar (1992-), Paris Saint-Germain footballer, top goalscorer of the Brazil national football team with Pelé
 Felipe Augusto de Almeida Monteiro - professional footballer

References

External links
 
 Official website of Mogi das Cruzes Municipal Government.

 
Populated places established in 1560